Purandhara waterfall (Nepali:पुरन्धारा झरना) is located in Babai Rural Municipality of Dang district near to Surkhet about 12 km south of Hapure. The waterfall has a height of  45 m and its water is drained to the Babai River. According to the legend, there is a Jata of Shiva from which the water is flowing out. 

Although the waterfall is one of the main touristic attraction of Dang district,  insufficient conservation works is reported.

See also
List of waterfalls of Nepal

References

Waterfalls of Nepal